Oscar Hold (19 October 1918 – 11 October 2005), was an English former footballer and manager, was born in Carlton, near Leeds, England. Hold played for Everton F.C. and Norwich City F.C. He became manager of Doncaster Rovers in 1962, taking over from Danny Malloy, and also managed Turkish champion Fenerbahçe SK on (1964–65), with whom he won the Turkish League title and Atatürk Cup titles. Then he trained the Saudi Al-Ahli club in Jeddah and won four titles, including the league title three times with two different names (General League Shield, King's Cup League) in 1968, 1970 and 1971 and the Saudi Crown Prince Cup in 1970. In 1983–84, he managed Apollon Limassol. He died in a Sunderland nursing home of bladder cancer in 2005.

References

1918 births
2005 deaths
People from Rothwell, West Yorkshire
Footballers from West Yorkshire
English footballers
Association football midfielders
Barnsley F.C. players
Aldershot F.C. players
Norwich City F.C. players
Notts County F.C. players
Chelmsford City F.C. players
Everton F.C. players
Queens Park Rangers F.C. players
English Football League players
English football managers
Doncaster Rovers F.C. managers
Fenerbahçe football managers
Al-Ahli Saudi FC managers
Apollon Limassol FC managers
Göztepe S.K. managers
English Football League managers
Süper Lig managers
Saudi Professional League managers
Cypriot First Division managers
English expatriate football managers
English expatriate sportspeople in Turkey
English expatriate sportspeople in Saudi Arabia
English expatriate sportspeople in Cyprus
Expatriate football managers in Turkey
Expatriate football managers in Saudi Arabia
Expatriate football managers in Cyprus
Deaths from cancer in England
Deaths from bladder cancer